Maestro Gandolfino (Master Gandolfino) or Gandolfino d'Asti (documented last decade of 15th-century) was an Italian painter active in the Piedmont.

Biography
He is mainly known for a large single polyptych painted in 1493 for the church of San Domenico in Alba, Piedmont. A work previously attributed to Macrino d'Alba for the church of San Giovanni in Alba, was later attributed to Gandolfino. Both of these works are mentioned in the inventories of the Royal Gallery of Turin.

References

Year of birth unknown
Year of death unknown
15th-century Italian painters
Italian male painters
Painters from Piedmont